la Mañana also known as la Manyana is a newspaper of the province of Lleida in Spain. The paper was founded in 1938. The headquarters is in Lleida. It publishes in both Catalan and Spanish languages. In 1990 the circulation of the paper was 7,000 copies.

References

External links
The newspaper's website

1938 establishments in Spain
Catalan-language newspapers
Mass media in Lleida
Newspapers established in 1938
Spanish-language newspapers